Jamaal Talib Henry (born September 26, 1994), known professionally as Maaly Raw, is an American record producer and songwriter. He gained prominence in 2016 as the architect behind some of fellow Philadelphia native Lil Uzi Vert's most popular songs. In 2017, the duo teamed up on four tracks from Uzi's album, Luv Is Rage 2.

Maaly has also developed a collaborative relationship with New York stable A$AP Mob, having produced tracks on Cozy Tapes Vol. 1: Friends, A$AP Twelvyy's debut album, 12, and A$AP Ferg's third studio album, Still Striving. The producer still sticks close to home however, working extensively with Philly rapper Kur on several of his projects. He is recognizable from his producer tag "Dat Be Maaly Raw!". Maaly has gone on to work with Meek Mill, French Montana, Lil Yachty, Lil Uzi Vert, Coi Leray, and others.

Early life
Henry was born on September 26, 1994, in Philadelphia, Pennsylvania, where his mother was a teacher and his father was a computer technician. He is the youngest of four siblings, three boys and one girl. He lived in West Philadelphia, Southwest Philadelphia and Delaware County, and started producing music during his high school years when he attended Upper Darby High School. Henry was a basketball player. He stopped playing basketball in 2010 after his best friend and local Philly legend, Quandaar White, lost his life playing football. White and Henry grew up down the street from one another. Because his dad was a trumpet player in a West Philly High School band, Henry was introduced to music at a young age. In grade school, he started playing the clarinet. Much of Henry's childhood was spent in Southwest Philly with his cousin Nasir and his brother B-Jones. In West Philadelphia, Henry learned musical production through B-Jones, who had taught him to use the Fruity Loops software at the age of 17. A year later, he collaborated with a street rapper named Kur on a project, which he described as his debut as a professional.

Career
He started working with local rapper Kur who introduced him to another local artist Lil Uzi Vert. Henry had produced a song by Kur featuring Lil Uzi called "I Don't Give a Fuck", which led to constant collaborations between Henry and Lil Uzi. Both Henry and Charlie Heat co-produced Uzi's debut project The Real Uzi. His first official hit came with "Money Longer" off Uzi's project Lil Uzi vs The World, which has since gone double platinum. Henry also produced the songs "Canadian Goose", and "Hi Roller" off the project. XXL and HotNewHipHop both listed Henry as a top 30 producer of 2016. Henry then went on to produce three more tracks off Uzi's next project The Perfuct Luv Tape, which includes "Do What I want", "Ghetto Flowers", and "Original Uzi". In 2018, Henry went gold with the Playboi Carti track "Shoota" featuring Lil Uzi Vert. He also went gold with Meek Mill's Championships by producing the track "Almost Slipped". He is responsible for four tracks off Uzi's follow up tape Luv is Rage 2, which went platinum. The Fader described his production style as "hurls songs forward, their momentum deftly guided by his wickedly weird and winding melodies, and drums that at once skitter across and barrel down your insides." Henry cites Lex Luger as an influence to this musical work.

Production discography

 Lil Uzi Vert - The Real Uzi (2014): "Dumber", "I'm Sorry", "I Don't Know Nuffin", "Like 50", "Trappin Work"
 Quilly - Haines Street Hustler 5 (2014)
 Lil Uzi Vert - Luv Is Rage (2015): "Safe House", "Enemies"
 Lil Uzi Vert - Non-album single: "Uzi Manson" (2015)
 French Montana - MC4 (2016): "2 Times"
 Lil Uzi Vert - Lil Uzi Vert vs. the World (2016): "Canadian Goose, "Hi Roller", "Money Longer"
 Desiigner - New English (2016): "Da Day"
 Lil Uzi Vert - The Perfect LUV Tape (2016): "Do What I Want", "Of Course We Ghetto Flowers", "Original Uzi (4 of Us)"
 Rich the Kid - Keep Flexin (2016): "Liar Liar"
 ASAP Mob - Cozy Tapes Vol. 1: Friends (2016): "Runner"
 Lil Yachty - Non-album single: "Terminator" (2016)
 ASAP Ferg - Still Striving (2017): "Aww Yeah"
 Lil Uzi Vert - Luv Is Rage 2 (2017): "444+222", "Early 20 Rager", "UnFazed", "Dark Queen"
 Meek Mill - Meekend Music (2017): "Backboard"
 Meek Mill - Wins & Losses (2017): "Ball Player"
 G Herbo - Humble Beast (2017): "Black", "Lil Gangbangin Ass"
 Dave East - Karma (2017): "Feeling a Way"
 PnB Rock - GTTM: Goin Thru the Motions (2017): "New Day"
 Lil Skies - Life of a Dark Rose (2017): "The Clique"
 Mir Fontane - "Still in the Hood" (2017)
 Meek Mill - Championships (2018): "Almost Slipped"
 Nav - Reckless (2018): "Hold Your Hand"
 Kur - Smked Out (2018): "Home Invasion"
 Young Nudy - SlimeBall 3 (2018): "InDaStreets"
 Playboi Carti - Die Lit (2018): "Shoota"
AJ Tracey - AJ Tracey (2019): "Jackpot"
 Izi - Aletheia (2019): "Uh, che Peccato!"
 PNB Rock - "Right Now"
 MoneyMarr - "Insane"
 Nav - "Hold Your Hand"
 UnoTheActivist - "Purgatory"
 88GLAM - "Nice Talk"
 Ronnie Flex - "Non Stop"
 88GLAM featuring Gunna - "Racks"
 Kur featuring Tierra Whack - "Oh My God"
 Young Nudy - "Slimeball"
 Young Nudy - "InDaStreets"
 Playboi Carti - Whole Lotta Red: "Teen X", "New N3on"
 Coi Leray - "No More Parties" (2021)
 Coi Leray - "No More Parties (Remix)" (2021)
 Lil Uzi Vert - Red & White EP: "Flex Up", "Believe Me" 
 DC the Don - "Zombieland" (2022)

References

1994 births
Living people
Record producers from Pennsylvania
Musicians from Philadelphia